Ksenija Nagle (born 19 May 2003) is a Latvian footballer who plays as a defender for Latvian Women's League club Rīgas FS and the Latvia women's national team.

Club career
Nagle has played for Rīgas FS in Latvia at the UEFA Women's Champions League.

International career
Nagle made her senior debut for Latvia on 27 October 2020. She capped during the UEFA Women's Euro 2022 qualifying.

References

External links

2003 births
Living people
Latvian women's footballers
Women's association football defenders
Rīgas FS players
Latvia women's youth international footballers
Latvia women's international footballers